Melotone may refer to the following:

 Melotone (organ), an electrostatic tone generator incorporated into Compton cinema organs in the 1930s or the 1952 Compton Electrone model that revived the Melotone name
 Melotone Records (Australia), an Australian record label
 Melotone Records (US), an American record label